Great Migrations is a seven-episode nature documentary television miniseries that airs on the National Geographic Channel, featuring the great migrations of animals around the globe. The seven-part show is the largest programming event in the ten-year history of the channel and is part of the largest cross-platform initiative since the founding of the National Geographic Society. It was filmed in HD, and premiered on November 7, 2010 with accompanying coverage in the National Geographic magazine and an official companion book.

Episodes
Great Migrations debuted on November 7, 2010 worldwide. The series airs on the Sundays of the same month, spread across four hour-long chapters, excluding three supplemental hours which run on other dates. The National Geographic Channel estimated that the show's premiere would be accessible in 330 million homes across the globe.

Production
The production team traveled  over two and a half years tracking multiple species ranging from army ants to Mali elephants. Cinematographers went to great lengths to film the species and their migratory habits, although none were hurt in the process. Filming provided rare footage of various animal scenes, including the documentation of an elephant's funeral for the first time outside East Africa. Various technologies were used to film the show, such as the use of high-tech tags on monarch butterflies and elephant seals.

The Cineflex Heligimbal gyrostabilized cameras was widely utilized in the production. It allows rock-solid closeups to be shot from a kilometer up, a height that does not disturb the animals being filmed. The series also uses the ultra-slow motion Phantom HD camera by Vision Research and the "beyond high-def" Red camera.

Reception
Great Migrations was acclaimed, with considerable praise its cinematography and photography. The Washington Post remarked on the show's "compelling grandeur"; reviewer Tom Shales noted how contemporary nature films would inevitably be compared with the BBC classics, Planet Earth and Life. Great Migrations, he felt, superseded both in its narration and score. The Edmonton Journal went to the extent of praising the show's photography as being "so magnificent that there will be a boomlet in sales of high-definition televisions".

Awards
Won Primetime Emmy as Best Documentary Film

References

External links
 Great Migrations on the National Geographic Channel official site
 Great Migrations official companion book on Amazon.com

Nature educational television series
2010 American television series debuts
2010 American television series endings
2010s American television miniseries
National Geographic (American TV channel) original programming
Television series about animals
Animal migration